Kaire Indrikson (born 13 June 1961) is a retired Estonian backstroke swimmer who won two medals at the 1977 European Aquatics Championships. The same year she was chosen Estonian Sportspersonality of the year. During her career she set 33 Estonian records, and her record in the 200 m backstroke event stood from 1977 to 2009. 

After retiring from competitions she worked as a swimming coach. Her twin sister, Kaja Aljand, is also a former swimmer who competed at the national level.

References

1961 births
Living people
Estonian female backstroke swimmers
Soviet female backstroke swimmers
European Aquatics Championships medalists in swimming
Swimmers from Tallinn
Estonian swimming coaches